Tartu Mill AS (prior to 2010 Tartu Veski AS) is a milling company in Estonia and the largest milling company in the Baltic States.

The company marks its founding back to 1885, when the first big grain mill in Tartu was erected.

Tartu Mill stores, processes, purifies, and dries grains. Among its products there are wheat and rye flour, semolina, pasta, mixture for baking bread, dry mixtures, and various types of feed ingredients.

Since 2008 the company owns the majority shares of flour mill in Dobele, Latvia.

References

External links
Official Website
Agriculture B2B Portal

Food and drink companies of Estonia
Grain companies